Office is a 2013-2015 Indian Tamil-language work place comedy television series starring  Karthik Raj, Shruthi Raj, Vishnu, Madhumila, Udhayabhanu Maheswaran, Suzane George, Sidharth and Anbazhagan. The series was directed by Ram Vinayak and produced by K. J. Ganesh.

It aired on STAR Vijay from 11 March 2013 to 5 June 2015 Monday through Friday at 10:00PM (IST). It was the first full workplace drama in the Tamil television industry.

Summary

Office deals with the story and happenings of employees at Netech Solutions, an IT company. For Karthick, Vishnu, Raji, and Lakshmi, their office is a place where friendships and relationships bloom, even as they struggle to hold it together.

Seasons overview

Cast

Season 1

 Karthik Raj as Karthikeyan "Karthik"
 Shruthi Raj as Rajalakshmi "Raji"
 Vishnu as Vishnuvardhan "Vishnu"
 Uday Mahesh as Vishwanathan
 Madhumila as Lakshmi
 Suzane George as Suzane 
 Madhan Pandian as Madhan
 Anbazhagan "Anbu" as Anbu
 Gemini Mani as Mohan
 Azhagappan as Kattadurai "Katta"
 Jeevitha as Soundarya
 Raghavendran as Puli
 Mahalakshmi  as Angel
 R. Raveendran (R. Ravi/Jeeva Ravi)  as Karthikeyan's father
 Rekha Suresh as Karthikeyan's mother
 Isvar as Gautham Victor
 David Solomon Raja as David
 Akalya Venkatesan as Sumanthi

Season 2

 Karthik Raj as Karthikeyan
 Shruthi Raj as Rajalakshmi
 Vishnu as Vishnuvardhan
 Krish Balakrishnan as Krishnakumar
 Preethi Kumar as Manimegalai
 Sidharth kumaran as Kamal
 Anbazhagan as Anbu
 Gemini Mani as Mohan
 Azhagappan as Katta
 Raghavendra as Puli
 Pavithra Janani as Vanitha
 Anu Sulash as Madhavi
 Hema Rajkumar as Radhika
 R. Raveendran (R. Ravi/Jeeva Ravi)  as Karthikeyan's father
 Rekha Suresh as Karthikeyan's mother
 David Solomon Raja as David
Ashwin Kumar Lakshmikanthan as Ashwin

Awards and nominations

References

External links
Official website

Star Vijay original programming
2010s Tamil-language television series
2013 Tamil-language television series debuts
Tamil-language television shows
2015 Tamil-language television series endings